The Asian Boys' U18 Volleyball Championship, formerly known as the Asian Boys' U19 Volleyball Championship, is an international volleyball competition in Asia and Oceania contested by the under 19 men's national teams of the members of Asian Volleyball Confederation (AVC), the sport's continent governing body. Tournaments have been awarded every two years since 1997. The top four teams qualified for the FIVB Volleyball Boys' U19 World Championship. The current champion is Japan, which won its third title at the 2022 tournament.

The 13 Asian Championship tournaments have been won by five different national teams. Iran have won seven times and Japan have won three times. The other Asian Championship winners are Chinese Taipei, South Korea and India, with one title each.

The 2022 Asian Championship took place in Tehran, Iran.

Result summary

Teams reaching the top four

Champions by region

Hosts

Medal summary

Participating nations
Legend
 – Champions
 – Runners-up
 – Third place
 – Fourth place
 – Did not enter / Did not qualify
 – Hosts
Q – Qualified for the forthcoming tournament

Debut of teams

Awards

Most Valuable Player

Best Outside Spikers

Best Opposite Spiker

Best Setter

Best Middle Blockers

Best Libero

Former awards

Best Scorer

Best Spiker

Best Server

Best Blocker

Best Receiver

Best Digger

See also

 Asian Girls' U18 Volleyball Championship
 Asian Men's Volleyball Championship
 Asian Men's U23 Volleyball Championship
 Asian Men's U20 Volleyball Championship

External links
 Official AVC website

 
U19

V
International volleyball competitions
International men's volleyball competitions
Youth volleyball
Volleyball competitions in Asia
Biennial sporting events
Asian Volleyball Confederation competitions
Asian youth sports competitions